Lethe armandina, the Chinese labyrinth, is a species of Satyrinae butterfly found in western China, Assam and Burma.

References

armandina
Butterflies of Asia